Jon M. Sweeney (born July 18, 1967) is an author of popular history, spirituality, biography, poetry, fiction for young readers, and memoir. His most frequent subjects are Catholic, particularly St. Francis of Assisi, about whom Sweeney has written The St. Francis Prayer Book, Francis of Assisi in His Own Words, When Saint Francis Saved the Church, The Complete Francis of Assisi, and The Enthusiast, a biography that Richard Rohr calls "An immense and important contribution to our understanding of the great saint." 

HBO optioned the film rights to The Pope Who Quit, Sweeney's historical retelling of the 13th century Pope Celestine V, who was the first pope to ever willingly resign the position. More recently, a series of young reader fiction, The Pope's Cat, was begun, the first of which published on March 1, 2018, before the fifth anniversary of the papacy of Pope Francis. He has also written a biography of the popular Jesuit priest James Martin, SJ. 

Sweeney has been interviewed on CBS News, WGN-TV, Fox News, and WTTW's Chicago Tonight. He appeared on CBS Sunday Morning to talk about Saint Patrick on March 17, 2013. He is an independent scholar who lectures frequently and leads retreats. Sweeney is currently Editor at Large for Orbis Books in Maryknoll, New York, as well as Interim Director of The Lux Center for Catholic-Jewish Studies at Sacred Heart School of Theology in Hales Corners, Wisconsin.

Life
Sweeney was born on July 18, 1967 in St. Charles, Illinois. At the time of Sweeney's birth, his father Mark Sweeney was the youth pastor at First Baptist Church in Wheaton, Illinois and mother Janet stayed at home with his older brother, Douglas (born July 1965). Soon after he was born, Sweeney's family relocated to Oregon, where his parents had been married in 1964. The family returned to Wheaton in 1969 and Sweeney resided there until college. Sweeney is included in the book Legendary Locals of Wheaton, by Keith Call. 
  
Sweeney converted to Catholicism after spending twenty years as an active Episcopalian, on the feast day of St. Francis of Assisi (October 4) in Woodstock, Vermont, in 2009. He is married to Michal Woll, a rabbi, and has four children. Sweeney and Woll were profiled in "When a Jew and a Catholic Marry" by Mark Oppenheimer in America (magazine) in August 2017.

He currently lives in Milwaukee, Wisconsin.

Education
Sweeney attended Carl Sandburg Elementary School, Monroe Junior High (now Monroe Middle School), and Wheaton Christian High School (now Wheaton Academy), where one of his best friends was former U.S. House of Representatives member Randy Hultgren. He graduated high school in 1985.

He attended Moody Bible Institute for one year and then transferred to Wheaton College where he majored in philosophy and Medieval studies, graduating in 1989. While at Wheaton, he was a teacher's assistant in the philosophy department and research assistant to the philosophy chair, Arthur F. Holmes, one of two professors to whom he dedicated his book, The Complete Francis of Assisi. In a later interview with The Irish Catholic, he reflects on his college interests: "Going back to my college days, I was a medieval history major, so I was very interested in the time period, and I think that was because I always saw it as a period in history that unified Christians of all backgrounds. It is the period of time before all the splits came into the Church so I always found that appealing. The more often one could go back to those figures or those stories and retell them or re-imagine them, I thought, the better."

While in junior high and high school, Jon's father was a prominent publisher of Evangelical Christian books who introduced him to prominent religious figures such as Dr. Charles Caldwell Ryrie, Dr. Josh McDowell, and Dr. George Sweeting, then president of Moody Bible Institute, the school in downtown Chicago that Sweeney attended for his first year of college, and which his parents both attended.

While at Moody, Sweeney arranged to serve as a summer missionary in Batangas City, Philippines, an experience that he later wrote about in his memoir, Born Again and Again. Sweeney grew up intent on becoming an evangelical pastor,  but practiced as an Episcopalian for 21 years of his adult life and converted to Catholicism in 2009. Today he keeps a Jewish home with his wife, a rabbi, although still practices and identifies as a Catholic.

After finishing at Wheaton College (Illinois), Sweeney was an M.Div. and then an M.A. student at North Park Theological Seminary in Chicago. There he studied with Paul L. Holmer, among others, and focused on Kierkegaard and theology. Sweeney has written about his relationship with Holmer. Eventually, Sweeney left seminary without earning a degree.

Literary career

Sweeney began his career as a bookseller, first in Chicago, and then managing a theological bookstore in Central Square, Cambridge, MA, Divinitas Books. He saw his first works published at this time, poems and book reviews, in small journals including The Merton Seasonal, which was then edited by Robert Daggy. From bookselling he became a trade sales representative for Augsburg Fortress Publishing, traveling a seven-state territory in the Southeastern U.S. When promoted to trade sales manager two years later he moved his family to Minneapolis. Leaving there in 1997, Sweeney moved to Vermont to join the "Ben & Jerry's of religious publishing," Jewish Lights Publishing. After seven years as vice-president of marketing and sales at Jewish Lights Publishing in Woodstock, Vermont, and co-founding SkyLight Paths Publishing, also in Woodstock, Vermont, as its associate publisher and editor-in-chief, Sweeney became editor-in-chief and publisher at Paraclete Press in 2004, in Orleans, Massachusetts. He left there in 2015. After working at Franciscan Media as editorial director for one year, he became executive editor for trade books at Ave Maria Press in Notre Dame, Indiana. Today, he is both consulting editor-at-large for Ave Maria, and once again, publisher and editor-in-chief at Paraclete.

Sweeney's involvement and collaboration with other writers goes back many years. At the 2006 Festival of Faith and Writing at Calvin College in Michigan, he interviewed poet and memoirist Mary Karr on the main stage. Two years later at the same venue, he interviewed Mary Gordon. In early 2017, he interviewed novelist Marilynne Robinson for The Tablet in the UK.

In December 2016 Sweeney was elected to the board of the Catholic Publishers Association. As an editor and publisher, he has worked with authors such as Jean Vanier, Sandy Eisenberg Sasso, Andrew Harvey, Lawrence Kushner, Ronald Rolheiser, M. Basil Pennington, Brother Wayne Teasdale, and John Michael Talbot. He also serves on the governing board of The Lux Center for Jewish-Christian Studies, located on the campus of Sacred Heart Seminary and School of Theology, serving greater Milwaukee.

Sweeney's many books about Francis of Assisi have focused on debunking myths that he believes persist from films and novels of the 1960s and 1970s, such as the image of the "hippie" Francis that endures from "Brother Sun, Sister Moon," Franco Zeffirelli's 1972 movie.

Sweeney's recent projects include a book of short excerpts of the medieval, Dominican Order mystic, Meister Eckhart, retold as blank verse, coauthored with Mark Burrows; and a history of the rift between Bernard of Clairvaux and Peter Abelard in the 12th century, titled The Saint vs. the Scholar. He has also recently published a biography of his late friend and colleague, Phyllis Tickle. He spoke about Tickle's life at the Cathedral of St. John the Divine in New York City on November 2, 2016.

Sweeney often writes for online and print publications, including about books for America (magazine) and book reviews and features for The Tablet in London. He often writes on popular culture, as well, on topics such as the Catholicism of Lady Gaga, and the strange theology behind the scenes in American evangelicals' support of the presidency of Donald Trump. Published the morning after evangelist Billy Graham's death, Sweeney's "How Billy Graham shaped American Catholicism" was widely shared on social media.

On February 4, 2020 Sweeney appeared in a live telecast at America Media in New York City with Fr. James Martin, to promote his biography of him: James Martin, SJ: In the Company of Jesus.

Critical reception

Reception to Sweeney's work has been largely positive. His 2005 memoir about growing up in evangelicalism was praised by Betty Smartt Carter in the evangelical journal, Books & Culture: "To his credit, Sweeney examines his story and its meaning with unusual humility. He doesn't claim superiority to the people he came from, only an inability to accept all that they taught him." Graham Christian said of The Complete Francis of Assisi, in a Library Journal review, "It is immensely valuable to have in one volume the key writings by and about Francis and his first disciples; essential for libraries and individuals looking to expand their knowledge of this influential saint."

In a 2016 interview for The Irish Catholic magazine, Mags Gargan describes The Enthusiast: "Blending history and biography, Sweeney’s book reveals how Francis and Elias rebuilt churches, aided lepers and entertained as ‘God’s troubadours’ to the delight of the ordinary people who had grown tired of a remote and turbulent Church." She goes on to ask Jon about the background of the book and his personal interest in St. Francis of Assisi.

When Saint Francis Saved the Church won second place in the history category in the 2015 Catholic Press Association Awards for excellence. Sweeney was also among five reviewers who received a first place award for best review section in America magazine for its "Fall Books 1" entry.

Phyllis Tickle: Essential Spiritual Writings was recently named a finalist for a 2016 award from the Religion Newswriters Association for Religion Reporting Excellence.

Author and activist Dan Savage mentioned having The Pope Who Quit on his coffee table in a 2013 New York Times "By the Book" interview.

Anne Rice was a proponent of his book Inventing Hell, posting a link about it on her official Facebook page.

The Chicago Tribune reviewed Meister Eckhart's Book of the Heart together with poet Mary Oliver's Devotions in November 2017 and said of Sweeney's work, "A sure-footed path toward mastering one of the great masters of the last millennia."

Publishers Weekly in December 2017 reviewed Sweeney's biography, Phyllis Tickle: A Life, giving it a starred review and concluding, "This loving biography impressively captures the grace Tickle demonstrated during a long, dedicated life." In May 2018, the Milwaukee Journal-Sentinel named the book as one of the "85 books for summer reading."

Publishers Weekly in January 2018 reviewed Sweeney's collection, What I Am Living For, which includes essays by writers Pico Iyer, Sylvia Boorstein, James Martin, and Robert Barron (bishop), saying, "Timed to coincide with the 50th anniversary of Trappist monk Thomas Merton’s death, this compilation of essays edited by Sweeney (A Course on Christian Mysticism) provides a space for modern Christian writers to reflect on the ways Merton’s life and writings have influenced their spiritual thinking."

Also in January 2018, the popular website CatholicMom.com recommended Sweeney's forthcoming fiction for young readers, The Pope's Cat, saying: "The book is a great read for many reasons: first, the story of the independent cat is entertaining as she provides for herself. Second, the book is filled with good facts to teach children about the papacy and it makes the pope relatable to them. The illustrations are entertaining as well and are very large, so they’re easy for children to enjoy." In December 2018, Sweeney was a guest on the Morning Glory radio program of EWTN talking about his children's series.

Bibliography
Praying With Our Hands: 21 Practices of Embodied Prayer from the World’s Spiritual Traditions (2000)
The St. Francis Prayer Book: A Guide to Deepen Your Spiritual Life (2004)
Born Again and Again: Surprising Gifts of a Fundamentalist Childhood (2005)
The Lure of Saints: A Protestant Experience of Catholic Tradition (2005)
Strange Heaven: The Virgin Mary as Mother, Woman, Disciple, and Advocate (2006)
The St. Clare Prayer Book: Listening for God’s Leading (2007)
Almost Catholic: An Appreciation of the History, Practice, and Mystery of Ancient Faith (2008)
Cloister Talks: Learning From My Friends the Monks (2009)
Beauty Awakening Belief: How the Medieval Worldview Inspires Faith Today (2009)
Verily, Verily: The KJV – 400 Years of Influence and Beauty (2011)
Light in the Dark Ages: The Friendship of Francis and Clare of Assisi (2012)
The Pope Who Quit: A True Medieval Tale of Mystery, Death, and Salvation (2012)
Mixed-Up Love: Relationships, Family, and Religious Identity in the 21st Century (2013)
The Age of the Spirit: How the Ghost of an Ancient Controversy Is Shaping the Church (2014) [with Phyllis Tickle]
Inventing Hell: Dante, the Bible, and Eternal Torment (2014)
The Complete Francis of Assisi: His Life, The Complete Writings, and The Little Flowers (2015)
When Saint Francis Saved the Church: How a Converted Medieval Troubadour Created a Spiritual Vision for the Ages (2015)
The Enthusiast: How the Best Friend of Francis of Assisi Almost Destroyed What He Started (2016)
The Saint vs. the Scholar: The Fight between Faith and Reason (2017)
The St. Francis Holy Fool Prayer Book (2017)
Meister Eckhart’s Book of the Heart: Meditations for the Restless Soul [with Mark S. Burrows] (2017)
Phyllis Tickle: A Biography (2018)
The Pope's Cat (for children), illustrated by Roy DeLeon (2018)
 Margaret's Night in St. Peter's: A Christmas Story (for children), illustrated by Roy DeLeon (2018)
 Margaret's First Holy Week (for children), illustrated by Roy DeLeon (2019)
 Meister Eckhart's Book of Secrets [with Mark S. Burrows] (2019)
 St. Francis of Assisi: His Life, Teachings and Practices (2019)
 James Martin, SJ: In the Company of Jesus (2020)
 Margaret and the Pope Go to Assisi (for children), illustrated by Roy DeLeon (2020)
 Nicholas Black Elk: Medicine Man, Catechist, Saint (2021)
 Thomas Merton: An Introduction to his Life, Teachings, and Practices (2021)

As editor

The Road to Assisi: The Essential Biography of St. Francis – Paul Sabatier (2003)
Ireland’s Saint: The Essential Biography of St. Patrick – J.B. Bury (2008)
The Road to Siena: The Essential Biography of St. Catherine – Edmund Garratt Gardner (2009)
Francis of Assisi in His Own Words: The Essential Writings - Francis of Assisi (2013) 
Three Simple Men: And Other Holy Folktales – Leo Tolstoy (2015)
Phyllis Tickle: Essential Spiritual Writings - Phyllis Tickle (2015) 
Ralph Waldo Emerson: Essential Spiritual Writings - Ralph Waldo Emerson (2016)
A Course in Christian Mysticism - Thomas Merton (2017)
 What I Am Living For: Lessons from the Life and Writings of Thomas Merton (2018). Contributors include James Martin, Robert Barron (bishop), Sue Monk Kidd, and Pico Iyer.
 A Course in Desert Spirituality - Thomas Merton (2019)
 Jesus Wasn't Killed by the Jews: Reflections for Christians in Lent (2020) with contributors Amy-Jill Levine, Walter Brueggemann, Massimo Faggioli, and Rabbi Abraham Skorka

References

1967 births
Writers from Chicago
American male writers
Moody Bible Institute alumni
Wheaton College (Illinois) alumni
Living people